Bioconductor is a free, open source and open development software project for the analysis and comprehension of genomic data generated by wet lab experiments in molecular biology.

Bioconductor is based primarily on the statistical R programming language, but does contain contributions in other programming languages. It has two releases each year that follow the semiannual releases of R. At any one time there is a release version, which corresponds to the released version of R, and a development version, which corresponds to the development version of R. Most users will find the release version appropriate for their needs. In addition there are many genome annotation packages available that are mainly, but not solely, oriented towards different types of microarrays.

While computational methods continue to be developed to interpret biological data, the Bioconductor project is an open source software repository that hosts a wide range of statistical tools developed in the R programming environment. Utilizing a rich array of statistical and graphical features in R, many Bioconductor packages have been developed to meet various data analysis needs. The use of these packages provides a basic understanding of the R programming / command language. As a result, R and Bioconductor packages, which have a strong computing background, are used by most biologists who will benefit significantly from their ability to analyze datasets. All these results provide biologists with easy access to the analysis of genomic data without requiring programming expertise.

The project was started in the Fall of 2001 and is overseen by the Bioconductor core team, based primarily at the Fred Hutchinson Cancer Research Center, with other members coming from international institutions.

Packages 
Most Bioconductor components are distributed as R packages, which are add-on modules for R. Initially most of the Bioconductor software packages focused on the analysis of single channel Affymetrix and two or more channel cDNA/Oligo microarrays. As the project has matured, the functional scope of the software packages broadened to include the analysis of all types of genomic data, such as SAGE, sequence, or SNP data.

Goals 
The broad goals of the projects are to:
 Provide widespread access to a broad range of powerful statistical and graphical methods for the analysis of genomic data.
 Facilitate the inclusion of biological metadata in the analysis of genomic data, e.g. literature data from PubMed, annotation data from LocusLink/Entrez.
 Provide a common software platform that enables the rapid development and deployment of plug-able, scalable, and interoperable software.
 Further scientific understanding by producing high-quality documentation and reproducible research.
 Train researchers on computational and statistical methods for the analysis of genomic data.

Main features 
 Documentation and reproducible research. Each Bioconductor package contains at least one vignette, which is a document that provides a textual, task-oriented description of the package's functionality. These vignettes come in several forms. Many are simple "How-to"s that are designed to demonstrate how a particular task can be accomplished with that package's software. Others provide a more thorough overview of the package or might even discuss general issues related to the package. In the future, the Bioconductor project is looking towards providing vignettes that are not specifically tied to a package, but rather are demonstrating more complex concepts. As with all aspects of the Bioconductor project, users are encouraged to participate in this effort.
 Statistical and graphical methods. The Bioconductor project aims to provide access to a wide range of powerful statistical and graphical methods for the analysis of genomic data. Analysis packages are available for: pre-processing Affymetrix and Illumina, cDNA array data; identifying differentially expressed genes; graph theoretical analyses; plotting genomic data. In addition, the R package system itself provides implementations for a broad range of state-of-the-art statistical and graphical techniques, including linear and non-linear modeling, cluster analysis, prediction, resampling, survival analysis, and time series analysis.
 Genome annotation. The Bioconductor project provides software for associating microarray and other genomic data in real time to biological metadata from web databases such as GenBank, LocusLink and PubMed (annotate package). Functions are also provided for incorporating the results of statistical analysis in HTML reports with links to annotation WWW resources. Software tools are available for assembling and processing genomic annotation data, from databases such as GenBank, the Gene Ontology Consortium, LocusLink, UniGene, the UCSC Human Genome Project and others with the AnnotationDbi package. Data packages are distributed to provide mappings between different probe identifiers (e.g. Affy IDs, LocusLink, PubMed). Customized annotation libraries can also be assembled.
 Open source. The Bioconductor project has a commitment to full open source discipline, with distribution via a SourceForge.net-like platform. All contributions are expected to exist under an open source license such as Artistic 2.0, GPL2, or BSD. There are many different reasons why open-source software is beneficial to the analysis of microarray data and to computational biology in general. The reasons include:
 To provide full access to algorithms and their implementation
 To facilitate software improvements through bug fixing and plug-ins
 To encourage good scientific computing and statistical practice by providing appropriate tools and instruction
 To provide a workbench of tools that allow researchers to explore and expand the methods used to analyze biological data
 To ensure that the international scientific community is the owner of the software tools needed to carry out research
 To lead and encourage commercial support and development of those tools that are successful
 To promote reproducible research by providing open and accessible tools with which to carry out that research (reproducible research is distinct from independent verification)
 Open development. Users are encouraged to become developers, either by contributing Bioconductor compliant packages or documentation. Additionally Bioconductor provides a mechanism for linking together different groups with common goals to foster collaboration on software, possibly at the level of shared development.

Milestones 
Each release of Bioconductor is developed to work best with a chosen version of R. In addition to bugfixes and updates, a new release typically adds packages. The table below maps a Bioconductor release to a R version and shows the number of available Bioconductor software packages for that release.

Resources

See also

Computational biology
Bioinformatics
List of open source bioinformatics software
List of sequence alignment software
R (programming language)
DNA microarray
Affymetrix, a microarray technology platform

References

External links
 
 The R Project GNU R is a programming language for statistical computing.
 Bioconductor Releases
 The community of the Debian GNU/Linux distribution strives towards an automated building of BioConductor packages  for their distribution. BioKnoppix and Quantian are projects extending Knoppix that have contributed bootable Debian GNU/Linux CDs providing BioConductor installations.

Free bioinformatics software
Free R (programming language) software
Science software for macOS
Science software for Windows
Science software for Linux